Ernst Fridolf Wetterstrand (9 October 1887 – 21 August 1971) was a Swedish rower who competed in the 1912 Summer Olympics.

In 1912 he was a member of the Swedish boat Vaxholm which was eliminated in the first round of the coxed four competition.

References

External links
profile

1887 births
1971 deaths
Swedish male rowers
Olympic rowers of Sweden
Rowers at the 1912 Summer Olympics